Nottingham High School is a private fee-charging day school for boys and girls in Nottingham, England, with an infant and junior School (ages 4–11) and senior school (ages 11–18). There were 1177 students enrolled as at January 2022, of whom 262 were in the sixth form, studying for advanced certificate examinations.

History

Foundation

In 1513, the "Free School" was founded by Dame Agnes Mellers, after the death of her husband Richard, partly in his memory, but also as atonement for wrongdoings against the people of Nottingham. To do so she enlisted help from Sir Thomas Lovell as governor of Nottingham Castle and Secretary to the Treasury. Through their combined efforts, king Henry VIII sealed the school's foundation deed on the 22 November that year. It is unclear whether this was a new institution or an endowment of an existing school, of which records exist back to 1289. Almost 20,000 boys are estimated to have attended between 1513 and 2013.

In the foundation deed, Mellers provided for a commemoration service in St Mary's Church in the Lace Market "on the Feast of the Translation of St Richard of Chichester, namely 16 June" each year, although the service "is now held on the nearest Saturday to that date." With the exception of Nottingham Goose Fair, this is the most ancient ceremonial event still held in the city of Nottingham, and the oldest still largely in its original form (the Goose Fair now being a funfair rather than a livestock fair), although there seems to be no record of it being held between the mid-16th century and its revival in 1923. The formal procession seeks to symbolise the ancient links the school has with the Crown, the city and the church. The foundation deed also provides for distributing (out of a total sum of 20 shillings) certain monies to the lord mayor of Nottingham, vicar and others. and for the purchase of bread, cheese and ale for consumption by officials attending the service. Any balance remaining is required to be given to the poorest scholar, but now is given to a representative scholar of the school.

Coat of arms
The College of Arms granted the school a coat of arms in 1949, the full blazon being:

The motto, Lauda finem, is Latin for "praise [to] the end".

The arms incorporate those of the founder: the arms of the Mellers family were three blackbirds (or merles – an example of canting arms) – on a white field; Dame Agnes, being a woman, would have displayed them on a lozenge, not a shield. In 2007 the school unofficially introduced a new logo for more general use, a modified version of the shield that omits the lozenge and ermine field.

Remembrance Day service

An annual Remembrance Day service on 11 November is attended by the whole school with the headmaster, president of the Old Nottinghamians and the school captain placing wreaths at the war memorial. Scholars attend a morning special assembly usually in the Player Hall, at which a minute's silence is observed. Representatives of the school's Combined Cadet Force mark their respect with a parade around the main school building.

Premises

Location
Since 1868 the school has stood high on Waverley Mount to the north of the city centre, looking down towards its foundation site in St Mary's Church and continuance in Stoney Street. The present site has undergone a long programme of building and development.

Main building

An example of Gothic Revival architecture, the original school building on the present site, built between 1866 and 1867, was designed by Thomas Simpson. It consists of a tower and three wings: West Wing, Middle Corridor and East Wing. West Wing houses classrooms for mathematics, English and geography. Housed in Middle Corridor are the learning support department, two ICT centres, two language laboratories, religious studies classrooms, two multi-purpose lecture theatres, the library and staff offices. East Wing contains the old gymnasium, the Player assembly hall and classrooms for modern languages, history and classics. The school front and other features are Grade II listed.

Tower
Overlooking the city centre is the school tower, used as a staff office. A school standard and the Union Flag are raised on it on special occasions such as Founder's Day and the official birthday, and as remembrance should a member of the school staff have died.

Additions
To the west, the Founder Hall building was built in 1963 to mark the school's 450th anniversary. It includes the school's swimming pool and the Founder Hall itself, and acts as a performing venue to supplement the Player Hall. A drama studio was added in 2013 to mark the school's 500th anniversary.

The Simon Djanogly Science Building from 1984 is situated to the south west with 13 laboratories for all three sciences. A 25-yard CCF shooting range remains in the basement. The building was opened on 2 March 1984 by the Duke of Edinburgh.

In front of the science building is the music school, completed in 1997. This houses the Lady Carol Djanogly Recital Hall, the Jones Trust Music Room, a music technology studio, a resources centre, seven instrumental teaching rooms and a larger brass teaching room, a percussion studio and a classroom for Infant and Junior School pupils.

In 1989 a sports hall was built on land to the north-east of the site formerly occupied by fives court and a shooting range. It contains an multi-purpose exercise hall and a fitness room for older pupils.

In the north-west corner is the Sir Harry Djanogly Art, Design and Technology Centre. The ground floor was built in the mid-1990s and a first floor added in the 2003/2004 academic year to accommodate modern facilities for the Art Department.

A new dining hall and sixth form centre were constructed in the West Quad in 2009.

Lovell House Building
Waverley House School to the west of the main site was purchased in 2008. The site was refurbished and renamed the Lovell House Infant School. In 2013, this single-sex establishment was combined with the Junior School to form Nottingham High Infant and Junior School.

Playing field
It features a number of rugby pitches and posts during winter, which are converted for athletics in the spring, with a running track and areas for shot put, javelin, discus, pole vault, hurdles and high jump. During the summer, the ground is used for cricket, with nets and squares created for the season. Tennis courts and an archery range are also located there. The pavilion has several changing rooms on the ground and first floors, and a refreshment area for staff and guests. Until 1897, pupils took their PE and games lessons at the Forest Recreation Ground.

School organisation
The junior and senior schools both have four houses, each named after a person connected with the school. The house system plays an integral role in school life. House tutors provide pastoral care and support.

Junior school houses
The junior school's four houses are named after former pupils or staff who served with distinction in the First World War and were killed in action or died of their wounds. Ball's House recalls Albert Ball, a fighter pilot in the RFC and pupil at the school in 1907–1909, Hardy's House Theodore Hardy, an assistant master in 1891–1907 and a British Army chaplain in 1916–1918, Tonkin's House FC Tonkin, a former pupil who served in the King's Royal Rifle Corps, and Trease's House Reginald Trease, a pupil at the school in 1898–1905. The houses compete annually for a General Efficiency Cup donated in 1927 by William Crane.

Senior school houses
The four houses in the senior school are Mellers', named after the school's founder, Cooper's, named after Frederick Cooper, an artist who in 1872 donated almost  of land to the school, Maples', named after Samuel Maples, a former pupil who bequeathed £3,000 to fund scholarships in 1892, and White's, after Sir Thomas White, who endowed a charity to provide interest-free loans to "young men of good name and thrift" in the Midlands, some money from which was lent to the school in slightly questionable circumstances in the mid-19th century).

Wheeler Cup
Houses compete for the Wheeler Cup, which is awarded on the cumulative performance in competitions throughout the school year. These cover athletics, chess, hockey, cross country, rugby, bridge, shooting, swimming, cricket, general knowledge, verse recitation, singing, and individual music.

Curriculum
Nottingham High School offers a wide range of GCSE, Advanced Subsidiary-Level (AS-level) and General Certificate of Education Advanced-Level (GCE A-level) subjects. Many are also studied by younger pupils at the school in years seven and nine.

Sixth-form subjects include Ancient Greek, art, biology, chemistry, classical civilization, computer science, design and technology, drama, economics, English language, English literature, Extended Project Qualification (EPQ), French, further mathematics, geography, government and politics, German, history, Latin, mathematics, music, music technology, physical education, physics, psychology, religious studies, statistics, and Spanish.

All sixth-form students were expected to undertake the EPQ from 2010, but for students entering sixth form from 2019 it is optional.

Uniform
In years 7 to 11, the uniform consists of a black blazer with a badge bearing the arms of Dame Agnes Mellers (displayed on a lozenge), black trousers or a black skirt, a white or grey shirt, black leather shoes, a house tie, and black, grey or navy blue socks. It is also possible to wear a jumper under the blazer. This is black with the school crest on the right chest. For those who have represented the school in sport, it may be black and bear the school coat of arms.

In the sixth form, students wear a black, grey or navy blue suit with a shirt of any colour but black.

Ties are a feature of the school uniform and used to signify pupils' status within the school.

Special ties include:
Foundation – A black tie bearing a red squirrel holding a ducal coronet (the crest from the school's coat of arms), presented on Founder's Day to pupils who have performed well in public examinations (at least ten grade As at GCSE or three As at A-Level), and to teachers on completing ten years' service
Lovell Order – Black, bearing the arms of Sir Thomas Lovell, for those who have performed a special service, such as librarians, the choir, orchestra and band secretaries, society officials and the stage staff, and teachers completing twenty years' service
Sports Colours – White with narrow diagonal black and yellow stripes, for high sporting achievement, such as first-team level (usually for sports, and occasionally chess, bridge and general knowledge teams)
Music Colours – Similar to sports colours, first awarded in 2007 to mark outstanding contributions to school music
Third XV – Black with orange stripes to members of the school rugby third XV
Prefects – no longer awarded
Officers – Black with red stripes, bordered by white bands with the school coat-of-arms at top, presented since 2005 to Officers of the School (School Captain, School Vice-Captains and House Captains)
Quincentenary – Black with diagonal stripes and school coat-of-arms, designed by Young Enterprise Team Sterling, sold to pupils and Old Nottinghamians to mark the 500th anniversary of the School

Fees
The school charges admission fees. About a tenth of pupils are supported by bursaries or scholarships giving a reduction of between 10 and 100 per cent, depending on family income.

Media
Some of a 1990 episode of the TV series "Boon", starring Michael Elphick, was filmed at the school, with some pupils as extras. The story was entitled "Bully Boys", the sixth episode of the fifth series, broadcast on 30 October 1990. The main playground, the Bridge Library (now the library reception), and the Valley Road playing fields were shown.

Kevin Fear (the school's current headmaster) and certain boys, were filmed by ITV for a news story shown as part of the news programme "ITV News Central". Filming took place at several school locations, including the headmaster's office, various classrooms and the Lower School Library. The news was that the school had announced it would admit girls – for the first time in its 500-year history – from 2015/2016.

List of masters

* Resigned or retired
† Died in office
‡ Never assumed post

Brian Garnet (headmaster 1565 – c. 1575) is notable as the father of the Jesuit priest Henry Garnet, who was executed for his involvement in the Gunpowder Plot.

Notable alumni

All former pupils and staff members are granted the title "Old Nottinghamian". For more than a century, the Old Nottinghamians' Society has existed continuously, with its origins dating back to 1897, at which time it was called the NHS Dinner Committee. Between 1902 and 1961 it was known as the Nottingham High School Old Boys' Society.

Arts

Michael Eaton (b. 1954), writer
Christopher Hogwood (1941–2014), classical musician, harpsichordist, scholar and conductor
Thomas Cecil Howitt (1889–1968), architect responsible for the design of the Nottingham Council House
D. H. Lawrence (1885–1930), writer and publisher
Nicholas McGegan (b. 1950), classical musician, conductor
Geoffrey Trease (1909–1998), author

Academia and religion
Eric Abbott (1906–1984), Warden of Keble College, Oxford; Dean of Westminster
Michael Argyle (1925-2002) social psychologist
Samuel Ayscough (1745–1804), index compiler
Ben G. Davis (b. 1970), chemist and fellow of Pembroke College, Oxford
Henry Garnet (1555–1606), Jesuit priest executed 1606 for his complicity in the Gunpowder Plot
John K. Inglis (died 2011), biologist, writer and lecturer
Frank Byron Jevons (1858–1936), Vice-Chancellor of the University of Durham
Robert Mcfarlane (b. 1976), travel writer and fellow of Emmanuel College, Cambridge

Victor Mundella (1866–1939), Physicist and Principal of Sunderland Technical College
Thomas Wingate Todd (1885–1938), anthropologist, orthodontist
R. M. W. Dixon (b. 1939), linguist

Armed forces
Albert Ball (1896–1917), the first Royal Flying Corps to be awarded the Victoria Cross
Theodore Hardy (1863–1918), NHS schoolmaster, non-combatant chaplain in the Great War, awarded the Victoria Cross

Media and entertainment
Kenneth Adam (1908–1978), Controller of the BBC
Malcolm Balen (living), author and broadcaster
Raymond Buckland (1934–2017), author and occultist
Michael Bywater (b. 1953), writer and broadcaster
Jonathan Charles (b.1964), BBC Foreign Correspondent
Leslie Crowther (1933–1996), comedian and quiz show host
Trevor Dann (b. 1951), broadcaster and producer of the 1985 Live Aid concert
David Leigh (b. 1946), investigative journalist and investigative executive editor for The Guardian
Keith Mansfield (b. 1965), writer

Simon Miller (living), writer/director
Chris Moncrieff (1931–2019), Press Association political journalist
 Andrew Nickolds (1949–2022), writer

Tim Royes (1964–2007), music video director and editor
Daniel Storey (living), writer and broadcaster
Jonny Sweet (b. 1985), comedian and actor
Michael Watts (1938–2018), journalist and broadcaster

Civil and diplomatic service
Alan Charlton (b. 1952), British ambassador to Brazil
Peter Gregson (1936–2015), permanent secretary of the Department of Trade and Industry
Richard Lloyd-Jones (b. 1933), permanent secretary of the Welsh Office
Lord Richardson of Duntisborne, governor of the Bank of England from 1973 until 1983

Douglas Wass (1923–2017), sometime permanent secretary of the Treasury and Head of the Home Civil Service
Geoffrey Owen Whittaker (1932–2015), governor of Anguilla 1987–1989

Commerce
Jesse Boot later Lord Trent (1850–1931), founder of the chemist chain Boots (now the Boots Group)
Roger Carr (b. 1946), knight, businessman
John Player (d. 1884), tobacconist (John Player & Sons), after whom the school's Player Hall is named

Law
Sir Roderic Wood (b. 1951), High Court judge

Politics
Ed Balls (born 1967), former Labour MP, secretary of state for children, schools and families, economic secretary to the treasury and shadow chancellor of the exchequer
Jonathan Bullock (born 1963), former Brexit Party member of the European Parliament for the East Midlands constituency
Kenneth Clarke (born 1940), independent Member of Parliament, former Conservative Lord Chancellor and justice secretary, chancellor of the exchequer and home secretary
Ed Davey (born 1965), MP, Liberal Democrat Member of Parliament, minister in the Department for Business, Innovation and Skills and leader of the Liberal Democrats
David Frost (b. 1965), British politician, diplomat and civil servant
Geoff Hoon (born 1953), former Member of Parliament, transport secretary, minister of state for Europe, secretary of state for defence and leader of the House of Commons
Sir James Lester (1932–2021), Conservative politician
Piers Merchant (1951–2009), former Conservative Member of Parliament and former general secretary of UKIP
James Morris (born 1967), MP, Conservative Member of Parliament

Science and technology
Ben G. Davis (b. 1970), University of Oxford
Thomas Hawksley (1807–1893), civil engineer and chief engineer at the Nottingham Waterworks Company
J. P. Knight (1828–1886), inventor of the traffic light
Frank Nabarro (1916–2006), solid-state physicist

Sport
Patrick Bamford (b. 1993), footballer
Charles Caborn (b. 1856, death date unknown), footballer for Nottingham Forest who appeared in their first FA Cup match.
Anuj Dal (b. 1996), professional cricketer
Anthony Douglas (b. 1985), Olympic short track speed skater
Graham Harding (b. 1966), cricketer
David Haywood (b. 1945), cricketer
Alex Lewington (b. 1991), rugby union player
Leonard Lindley (1861–1915), footballer and cricketer, brother of Tinsley
Tinsley Lindley (1865–1940), international footballer and cricketer, brother of Leonard
 Mark Saxelby b 1969 d. 2000 professional cricketer (outstanding rugby union player)
Henry Nwume (b. 1977), professional rugby union player and bobsleigh Olympian
Anthony Palfreman (b. 1946), cricketer and cricket administrator
Reg Simpson (1920–2013), England cricketer
Greig Tonks (b. 1989), rugby union player
Andy Turner (b. 1980), professional Olympic sprint hurdler

References

Educational institutions established in the 1510s
1513 establishments in England
Member schools of the Headmasters' and Headmistresses' Conference
Private schools in Nottingham
Gothic Revival architecture in Nottinghamshire